Elda Peralta is a Mexican actress and writer.

Selected filmography
 Hypocrite (1949)
 Immaculate (1950)
 Women's Prison (1951)
 Streetwalker (1951)
 Crime and Punishment (1951)
 A Woman Without Love (1952)
 My Darling Clementine (1953)
 Remember to Live (1953)

References

External links

1932 births
Living people
Mexican television actresses
Mexican film actresses
Mexican stage actresses
People from Hermosillo
Actresses from Sonora
20th-century Mexican actresses